Saccharicrinis carchari is a Gram-negative and facultative anaerobic bacterium from the genus of Saccharicrinis which has been isolated from the gill of a dead shark (Cetorhinus maximus) from the Yellow Sea in China.

References

Bacteria described in 2014
Bacteroidia